Federal Route 272, or Jalan Telaga Tujuh, is a major federal roads in Langkawi Island, Kedah, Malaysia. It is also a main route to Telaga Tujuh (the Seven Wells).

Features

At most sections, the Federal Route 272 was built under the JKR R5 road standard, with a speed limit of 90 km/h.

List of junctions and towns

References

Malaysian Federal Roads
Roads in Langkawi